This list of concerti grossi contains work in the concerto grosso genre.

Concerto Grosso (Gregori), a 1698 work by Giovanni Lorenzo Gregori
Twelve concerti grossi, op.6 (Corelli), work by Arcangelo Corelli
Three sets of concerti grossi, op.2 (1732), op.3 (1733) and op.7 (1746) by Francesco Geminiani
L'estro Armonico, op.3 work by Antonio Vivaldi
Concerto Grosso (Locatelli), work by Pietro Locatelli
Concerto Grosso (Torelli), work by Giuseppe Torelli
Concerto Grosso (Manfredini), work by Francesco Manfredini
 Concerti Grossi dalle Sonate di Corelli, work by Giovanni Benedetto Platti
Brandenburg Concertos, a set of 6 works by Johann Sebastian Bach
Handel concerti grossi Op.6, a 1739 work by George Frideric Handel
Handel concerti grossi Op.3, a collection of various preexisting works by George Frideric Handel assembled by his publisher John Walsh in 1743
Concerto Grosso No. 1 (Bloch), a 1925 work by Ernest Bloch
Concerto Grosso No. 2 (Bloch), a 1952 work by Ernest Bloch
Concerto Grosso (Martinu) H.263 a 1937 work by Bohuslav Martinů
Double Concerto for Two String Orchestras, Piano, and Timpani (Martinů), H. 271 (1938)
Concerto in E-flat (Dumbarton Oaks), work by Igor Stravinsky
Concerto Grosso (Vaughan Williams), work by Ralph Vaughan Williams
Concerto Grosso (Williamson), work by Malcolm Williamson
Concerto Grosso (Cowell), work by Henry Cowell
Six concerti grossi by Alfred Schnittke
Concerto Grosso (Villa-Lobos), work by Heitor Villa-Lobos
Concerto Grosso (Eshpai), work by Andrei Eshpai
Concerto Grosso (Tamberg), work by Eino Tamberg
Two concerti grossi by Krzysztof Penderecki, No. 1 for three cellos and orchestra (2000), No. 2 for five clarinets and orchestra (2004)
Concerto Grosso (Françaix), work by Jean Françaix
Concerto Grosso by Pelle Gudmundsen-Holmgreen
Concerto Grosso (Glass), work by Philip Glass
Concerto Grosso, a 1985 work by Vladimir Godar
Concerto Grosso, 1985 work by Ellen Taaffe Zwilich
Concerto Grosso (New Trolls), work by New Trolls
Palladio, suite from the 1996 album Diamond Music by Karl Jenkins
Concerto Grosso, a 2013 work by Svitlana Azarova
Concerto Grosso No. 1, a 2017 work by Jordan Kabat

See also
Concerto grosso

Concerti grossi